Since 1949, China has carried out extensive land reclamation projects. It is among the countries which have built the most artificial land; from 1949 to 1990s, the total area of land reclaimed from the sea of China was about 13,000 km2.

Mainland China

A grand total of 150 km2 was planned to be reclaimed from the sea in 2009.

Guangdong
From June 2004 to the present, land reclamation is going on at Shantou. Project surface to reclaim is 146 km2.

Jiangsu
Between 2009 and 2020, Jiangsu will reclaim 21 parcels of tidal areas along the southern Yellow Sea, yielding a total of 1,817 square km of new land.

Liaoning
Starting in March 2005, the Caofeidian Land Reclamation Project (曹妃甸围海造地工程) reclaimed a total of 310 km2  next to the island of Tangshan. The first stage of 12 km2 was finished on 28 March 2006. The plan is to make space for the new industrial base of Shougang.

Shanghai
Between 2003 and 2006, the Shanghai government spent 40 billion yuan on the Nanhui New City, formerly called Lingang New City Project (临港新城计划) of Shanghai, to reclaim 133.3 km2 of artificial land from the sea.

Zhejiang
Starting in 1975, the largest single land reclamation project in Zhejiang Province has been the Xuanmen Land Reclamation Project (漩门围垦工程) in Yuhuan County. It has three phases, of which phase II covered 53.3 km2 (February 1999 - April 2001), and phase III 45.3 km2 (March 2006 - 2010).
 Total land reclamation in the area of Taizhou City between 2004 and 2010, including the project mentioned above, will be 266.7 km2.

Special Administrative Regions

Hong Kong

The government of Hong Kong started reclaiming land from the surrounding sea as early as the 1840s. Formal reclamation starts at 1860s and its land reclamation is still proceeding. A notable achievement is Hong Kong International Airport, built in the 1990s on reclaimed land, absorbing the former islands Chek Lap Kok and Lam Chau.

Macau

The original size of Macau was expanded by 170% (17 km2 of artificial land). Currently the land reclamation of Macau is still ongoing.

South China Sea

In the 21st century, the PRC has upheld the 1947 claims of the Republic of China (modified by Zhou Enlai into a Nine-Dash Line) over most of the South China Sea through a series of disputed mid-ocean land reclamation projects in the Spratly Islands known as the "Great Wall of Sand". The islands being expanded or created by the project are notionally administered as parts of Sansha in Hainan Province. As of December 2016, the projects in the Spratlies covered  of land protected by "'significant' weapons systems, including anti-aircraft and anti-missile systems".

See also
 Land rehabilitation
 Land improvement
 United States Bureau of Reclamation
 Society for Protection of the Harbor
 Territorial changes of the People's Republic of China
 Polder - low-lying land reclaimed from a lake or sea
 Soil salinity control - reclamation of saline land
 Watertable control - reclamation of waterlogged land
 Drainage system (agriculture) - drainage for land reclamation

References

Coastal construction
History of the People's Republic of China
Land reclamation